Tim Nelson or Timothy Nelson may refer to:

Entertainment
Tim Blake Nelson (born 1964), American actor and director
Tim Nelson (musician), lead vocalist of Australian band Cub Sport
Timothy Nelson, an Australian musician and lead singer of Timothy Nelson & The Infidels.

Sports
Tim Nelson, baseball manager for Ottawa Fat Cats
Tim Nelson (lacrosse) (born c. 1963), American lacrosse player
Tim Nelson (pickleball), namesake of the Nasty Nelson serve
Tim Nelson (runner) (born 1984), American distance runner